All Faces West is a 1929 American Western film directed by Raymond K. Johnson and starring Ben Lyon, Marie Prevost and Anders Randolf. It was shot in late 1928 on location in Utah. It premiered in Salt Lake City as a silent film, but was re-edited in 1931 with added music and sound effects for re-release as a sound fim under the alternative title Call of the Rockies.

Synopsis
The film focuses on the settling of Utah by Mormon pioneers in the mid-nineteenth century.

Cast
 Ben Lyon as Mathew
 Marie Prevost as Arleta Vance
 Gladys Johnson as Sylvia 
 Anders Randolf as Jim Vance
 Russell Simpson as Gunner Bill
 James Mason as Tony / Kit Carson
 Tex Driscoll as The Stranger

References

Bibliography
 D'Arc, James. When Hollywood Came to Town: A History of Movie Making in Utah. Gibbs Smith,  2010.

External links
 

1929 films
1929 Western (genre) films
1920s historical films
American Western (genre) films
American black-and-white films
American historical films
Films directed by Raymond K. Johnson
Films set in the 19th century
Films shot in Utah
Transitional sound Western (genre) films
1920s English-language films
1920s American films